Jackass Hill is a mountain located in Central New York Region of New York east of Erieville, New York. Tuscarora Lake is located to the northwest of Jackass Hill.

References

Mountains of Madison County, New York
Mountains of New York (state)